David Walter Carlock is an American record producer, songwriter and multi-instrumentalist.

His production style has been described as very hands on and song oriented. He received a Grammy Award for engineering Pink's, "Trouble".

Biography

Early life
Carlock was born in St. Joseph, Michigan, the son of Jane (née Hadley), and Nelson Carlock. He discovered his love of music by singing in front of restaurant jukeboxes at the age of four.

In junior high school, he taught himself guitar, bass, and keyboards. After graduating from St. Joseph High School, Carlock was an engineer at local recording studios, produced bands, and did string arrangements for a 60-piece symphony.

He attended Western Michigan University in Kalamazoo, Michigan on an academic scholarship, before deciding to focus solely on his musical career.

Early career
He began his professional career as a songwriter and session musician for Columbia Records artist George LaMond, contributing songs and vocal and instrumental arrangements to LaMond's debut record Bad of the Heart. Carlock built a 16-track recording studio and continued to develop as a producer and writer. He later moved to New York, where he stayed for three years, and then moved to Los Angeles.

While in New York, Carlock worked as a technician and consultant with artists such as Hall & Oates and Lenny Kravitz using a recording platform known as Pro Tools. He produced local bands, most notably Coward, who signed with Elektra Records.

1998–2008
Carlock moved to Los Angeles, where he worked with Greg Ladanyi, producer of pop music artists like Don Henley, Jackson Browne, Fleetwood Mac, and Warren Zevon. He partnered with Ladanyi's Tidal Wave Entertainment in 1999 for a year, during which time they co-produced, with David Foster, The Tubes' live/studio hybrid album Tubes World Tour 2001, which featured collaborations with Richard Marx and Steve Lukather. Carlock's involvement with Ladanyi also led to sessions with Eric Clapton, Dolly Parton, Rodney Crowell, and others.

Carlock started a long collaboration in 2000 with Rancid frontman and punk rock songwriter Tim Armstrong, first as engineer/mixer on several projects for Armstrong's label, Hellcat Records, and then as co-producer/co-writer. The team's first co-production work was on the Transplants record, which was born out of the combination of two projects: a side project for Armstrong and a separate project Carlock and Armstrong were recording for Armstrong's friend and AFI roadie Rob Aston. After working off and on for two years, then adding Travis Barker to the band, the Transplants were formed. Carlock toured as keyboardist/sample guru during the Transplants tour with the Foo Fighters and appeared with the band on Jimmy Kimmel Live! and Snoop Dogg's Doggy Fizzle Televizzle show.

The Transplants singles "Diamonds and Guns" and "D.J. D.J." quickly became MTV favorites and earned the band critical and commercial success. "Diamonds and Guns" has been featured on TV commercials for Garnier Fructis shampoo and Neutrogena. The song was used on the soundtrack for the movie Bulletproof Monk (2003). The band followed up the record's success by touring with the Foo Fighters.

Carlock engineered on nine songs for Pink's album Try This in 2003, performing bass, vocals, keys and programming. Carlock next started up a production label called 27 Sounds to produce and collaborate with unsigned artists.

In 2004–2005, Carlock worked with the Transplants for their second album, Haunted Cities, co-producing and engineering with Tim Armstrong and contributing keyboards, bass, guitar, vocals, theremin, and songwriting.  In the fall, he also worked with Nine Inch Nails in preparation for their summer tour.

In 2006, several EPs produced and cowritten by Carlock were released by 27 Sounds artists. From the first group which included Counterpush, R&B/pop artist Jackie Ray, pop/rock/dance artist Shevyn and 14-year-old pop/rock artist Shelby Spalione.

Spalione was immediately signed by the producers of Hannah Montana after hearing her work with Carlock and seeing her perform at the House Of Blues in Hollywood. Shelby soon after adopted the name Shelby Cobra and became lead singer for KSM, on Walt Disney Records. UPDATE: In 2013, Shelby readopted her last name Spalione while appearing on the song "Bang Bang" with Will.I.Am for The Great Gatsby soundtrack, performing the song live with Will.I.Am on American Idol.

In the fall of 2007, Carlock relocated his recording studio to an emerging arts community on the shores of Lake Michigan, just outside Chicago and has since been writing and producing independent records for his 27 Sounds artists and mixing for other artists worldwide since.

Awards and honors 
In 2003, Carlock received a Grammy Award Certificate for his engineering work on Pink's song "Trouble".

Discography 
Tuscan Sky
Artist: Bryan Lubeck
Label: Vineyard Music Productions
Role:  E
Blue
Artist: Michelle Bythrow
Label: 27 Sounds
Role:  P/E/M/Arr/Instr
Wonderland Road
Artist: Jeff Cameron
Label: Gazworks
Role:  M
Bob Rubin Live
Artist: Bob Rubin
Label: Gazworks
Role:  M
A Different Story To Tell
Artist: Art Gomperz Band
Label: All About Murray Records
Role:  P/E/M
The Most Wonderful Time of the Year
Artist: Paul Mow
Label: TBA
Role:  E/M
Rough Day
Artist: Johnny Morales
Label: 27 Sounds
Role: P/E/M/W/Instr.
Dig Deep
Artist: Roger Steen Band
Label: TBA
Role  M
Vineyard Grooves
Artist: Bryan Lubeck
Label: Earthscape Media
Role: Vocals/E/Arr.
Our Song
Artist: Laura Scott
Label: TBA
Role: P/E/M/W/Instr.
DeeeLish
Artist: Desiree Cuchiara
Label: 27 Sounds
Role: P/E/M/W/Instr
Tell the Truth
Artist: Gary Cambra
Label: TBA
Role:  E/M/Instr
Honest To God
Artist: Trent Smith
Label:
Role: Mixer
Suffocating/Paralyzed
Artist: Charlie Kim
Label: 27 Sounds
Role: P/E/M/W/Instr
Criss Cross Applesauce
Artist: Shelby Spalione
Label: 27 Sounds
Role: P/E/M/W/Instr
Inneraction
Artist: Shevyn
Label: 27 Sounds
Role: P/E/M/W/Instr
Dragonfli Baby
Artist: Jackie Ray
Label: 27 Sounds
Role: P/E/M/W/Instr
End Of Reason
Artist: End Of Reason
Label: 27 Sounds
Role: P/E/M/W/Instr
Haunted Cities
Artist: Transplants
Label: LaSalle/Atlantic
Role: P/E/M/W/Instr
Hardcore For Life
Artist: Danny Diablo
Label: LaSalle
Role: E/M/W/Instr
Heart & Soul
Artist: Joe Cocker
Label: New Door
Role: Edit
Blisstique
Artist: Blisstique
Label: Woo
Role: P/E/M/W/Instr
Electric Ladybugs
Artist: Electric Ladybugs
Label: Koo Moon
Role: P/E/M/W/Instr
De Anima
Artist: Counterpush
Label: 27 Sounds
Role: P/E/M/W/Instr
Crickets & Their Buddies
Artist: The Crickets
Label: Sovereign Artists
Role: E/Edit/BGV
20 Bucks & Two Black Eyes
Artist: US Roughnecks
Label: Hellcat/Epitaph
Role: M
Try This
Artist: Pink
Label: LaFace
Role: E/Instr/BGV/
2004 Grammy Award Certificate—Engineer
RIAA Certified 2× PLATINUM US

BLINK-182
Artist: BLINK-182
Label: Geffen
Role: Pre-Prod E/Arr

RIAA Certified 2× PLATINUM US

Bryan Lubeck
Artist: Mysterious Woman
Label: Mamma Grace
Role: P/E/M
Rancid
Artist: Indestructible
Label: Hellcat/Warner
Role: Writer/E/Edit
West For Wishing
Artist: Matchbook Romance
Label: Epitaph
Role: E/Edit
We're a Happy Family: A Tribute to Ramones
Artist: Various
Label: DV8/Columbia
Role: M/E
Transplants
Artist: Transplants
Label: Hellcat
Role: P/E/M/W/Instr
The Defense
Artist: Bad Religion
Label: Epitaph
Role: E/Edit
Process Of Belief
Artist: Bad Religion
Label: Epitaph
Role: Edit
An American Paradox
Artist: Strung Out
Label: Fat Wreck Chords
Role: Edit
BYO Split Series, Vol. 3
Artist: Rancid/NOFX
Label: BYO
Role: M/E
Rancid (V)
Artist: Rancid
Label: Epitaph
Role: Edit
Sing Sing Death House
Artist: The Distillers
Label: Hellcat
Role: E
When Music Meets Film
Artist: Various
Label: Beyond
Role: Edit
Kiss Me There
Artist: Jo Davidson
Label: Edel America
Role: E/Edit
Tubes World Tour 2001
Artist: The Tubes
Label: CMC/Sanctuary
Role: P/E/M/Edit
Lucky Man
Artist: Hal Ketchum
Label: Curb
Role: Edit
Arch Allies: Live at Riverport
Artist: Styx
Label: Sanctuary
Role: E
Days Of Avalon
Artist: Richard Marx
Label: Signal 21
Role: Edit
Del Otro Lado
Artist: Araque
Label: Edel
Role: E/Edit
Tell The Story
Artist: Jo Davidson
Label: FTG Records
Role: Edit
Bajo el Azul de Tu Misterio
Artist: Jaguares
Label: BMG
Role: Edit
Sun
Artist: Lisa Hayes & The Violets
Label: Atlantic
Role: Edit
7 Deadly Zens
Artist: Tommy Shaw
Label: CMC
Role: Edit
Mi Mejor Regalo
Artist: Yolandita
Label: WEA
Role: W
Fiesta En Navidad
Artist: Various
Label: WTG Records
Role: W/Arr
Christmas In The City
Artist: Various
Label: WTG Records
Role: W/Arr
Bad Of The Heart
Artist: George LaMond
Label: Columbia
Role: W/Prog/Arr

References

External links
DaveCarlock.com (official website)

Living people
American rock musicians
Transplants (band) members
Year of birth missing (living people)